A heritage station is a long-running radio station.

Heritage station may also refer to:
Heritage station (Calgary), in Calgary, Alberta, Canada
Heritage Station Vineyard, in Gloucester County, New Jersey, United States
Heritage Square station, in Los Angeles, California, United States

See also
Heritage (disambiguation)